The Collector of Prints is a mid-19th century painting by French artist Edgar Degas. Done in oil on canvas, the painting is currently in the collection of the Metropolitan Museum of Art.

Description 
The painting depicts an art collector in his modest gallery. On display are a number of cheap lithographs accompanied by more valuable Chinese and Japanese art. It is one of many Degas paintings showing people at work in a way that defines their character.

The work is on view at the Metropolitan Museum's Gallery 815.

References 

Paintings in the collection of the Metropolitan Museum of Art
1866 paintings
Paintings by Edgar Degas